Datuk Seri Ir. Dr. Wee Ka Siong (born 20 October 1968) is a Malaysian  politician, and engineer who has served as the Member of Parliament (MP) for Ayer Hitam since March 2004. He served as Minister of Transport for the second term in the Barisan Nasional (BN) administration under Prime Minister Ismail Sabri Yaakob from August 2021 to the collapse of the BN administration in November 2022 and his first term in the Perikatan Nasional (PN) administration under former Prime Minister Muhyiddin Yassin from March 2020 to the collapse of the PN administration in August 2021, Minister in the Prime Minister's Department and the Deputy Minister of Education in the BN administration under former Prime Ministers Abdullah Ahmad Badawi and Najib Razak as well as former Ministers Hishammuddin Hussein and Muhyiddin from March 2008 to the collapse of the BN administration in May 2018.He is a member of the Malaysian Chinese Association (MCA), a component party of the BN coalition. He has also served as the 11th President of MCA since November 2018. He also served as the Deputy President of MCA from December 2013 to his promotion to the party presidency in November 2018 as well as the Youth Chief of MCA from October 2008 to his promotion to the party deputy president in December 2013. He was the sole minister of Chinese ethnicity and MCA in the PN and BN administrations from March 2020 to November 2022 and sole MCA candidate to be elected in the 2018 general election.

Early life and education
He was born in Jasin, Melaka to a Hakka clan and later brought up in Tampin, Negeri Sembilan. He attended the SJK(C) Yu Hsien primary school and Sekolah Menengah Kebangsaan Datuk Bendahara Jasin, Melaka.

He studied Civil Engineering at the Universiti Teknologi Malaysia (UTM) in 1986–1991. He later pursued his Master in Traffic Engineering at the Nanyang Technological University, Singapore from 1993 to 1996 and a PhD in Transportation Planning at the UTM from 1996 to 2001. He is a qualified Civil Engineer and is a member of the Board of Engineers Malaysia (BEM).

He is married to Datin Seri Jessica Lim Hai Ean, a lawyer and they have 2 children, a daughter and a son.

Early political career
Wee begin his political career in  Johor Bahru Malaysian Chinese Association, which he joined in 1992.. He was the Division Secretary of MCA Johor Bahru Division from 1993 to 2005. After that, he is elected as Johor Bahru's MCA Majidi Branch chairman from 1996 to 2008, and became the MCA Johor Bahru Division Youth Chief from 2002 to 2008.

In 2005 during the National MCA Youth election, he was elected as the National MCA Youth Wing Secretary General, and was appointed as the National MCA Youth Education Bureau Chief (2005–2008). He was awarded The Outstanding Young Malaysian (TOYM) Award (Politics, Governmental Affairs & Legal) by the Junior Chamber International Malaysia; this award was presented to him by Dato' Sri Ong Tee Keat, then Deputy Minister of Youth and Sports, in Kuala Lumpur on 25 November 2005.

On 13 October 2008, Wee was elected unopposed as the MCA Youth Chief for the 2008–2011 term, taking over the position from the Health Minister, Dato' Sri Liow Tiong Lai. On 11 November 2008, Wee Ka Siong was elected to lead the MCA Malacca State Liaison Committee. Prior to this, he was the secretary general for Malaysia Chinese Association Youth Wing.

In 2013, he contested, and won, the deputy presidency of the full party.

Cabinet Minister (2014–2018)
After the MCA's disastrous performance in the 2013 election, losing eight of its fifteen seats, the MCA voluntarily withdrew from its ministerial positions. The party returned in 2014 and Wee Ka Siong, by then the deputy president of the party, was appointed to the Cabinet as Minister in the Department.

After months of public speculations about Wee's health, on 2 May 2016 he made a statement that he would undergo a spinal surgery abroad and promised he will recover and return to duty soon.

Wee Ka Siong is the only member of MCA to hold a seat in the parliament after the Malaysian general election in May 2018.

Minister of Transport (2020-2022)
After the 2020–21 Malaysian political crisis, Wee has been appointed as Minister of Transport by the ruling government Perikatan Nasional.

Loke Siew Fook took over as Minister of Transport following the 2022 Malaysian general election.

Controversies and issues

Cabotage policy
Wee Ka Siong, had on November 13, 2020, signed a federal gazette revoking the cabotage exemption to foreign ships involved in the repair of submarine cables, which connects Malaysia to the global internet network. The exemption helped speed up repairs of submarine cables that are damaged from time to time, causing internet disruption in the country. In November 23, tech giants, including Microsoft, Google and Facebook, have turned to Prime Minister of Malaysia Muhyiddin Yassin for intervention over a decision by Wee Ka Siong, which they say will hamper Malaysia's internet infrastructure.

In November 26, Wee Ka Siong has assured tech giants Google, Facebook, Microsoft and Malaysia Internet Exchange (MyIX) that foreign vessels would be allowed to carry out undersea communications cable repair works if local vessels are unable to do it or are located too far from the areas where repairs are needed.

The long-running spat between Wee Ka Siong and DAP's Lim Guan Eng over the cabotage policy on foreign ships that repair submarine cables in Malaysia. In 2 November 2021, the two rival politicians are set for a one-hour debate session that started at 9.30pm. It is aired on Astro Awani and TV8, as well as on TV3’s social media pages.

Election results

Honours
  :
  Companion Class I of the Exalted Order of Malacca (DMSM) - Datuk (2008)
  Grand Commander of the Exalted Order of Malacca (DGSM) - Datuk Seri (2015)

See also
 Ayer Hitam (federal constituency)

External links 

 家祥部落格 Wee Ka Siong Blog
 魏家祥蓝色希望

References 

1968 births
Living people
People from Malacca
People from Lufeng
Malaysian people of Hakka descent
Malaysian politicians of Chinese descent
Malaysian Buddhists
Malaysian civil engineers
Presidents of Malaysian Chinese Association
Members of the Dewan Rakyat
Government ministers of Malaysia
University of Technology Malaysia alumni
Nanyang Technological University alumni
20th-century engineers
21st-century engineers
21st-century Malaysian politicians